Taytay National High School is a public high school in Taytay, Rizal, Philippines. The school situated at Zloty St., Meralco Village of Barangay San Juan, was established in 1994.

Other Public Secondary Schools 

Taytay National High School - TNHS extensions are consist of the following schools - Antonio C. Esguerra Memorial National High School, Benjamin B. Esguerra Memorial National High School, Casimiro A. Ynares Sr. Memorial National High School, Muzon National High School, Manuel I. Santos Memorial National High School and Simona National High School in random namings.

References

Education in Taytay, Rizal
High schools in Rizal